The 2019 Women's T20 Challenge was the second season of the Women's T20 Challenge, a Twenty20 cricket tournament established by the Board of Control for Cricket in India (BCCI) in 2018. Unlike previous year, this year it was a three team tournament instead of a one-off match, featuring a new team called IPL Velocity. It was held from 6 to 11 May 2019 at the Sawai Mansingh Stadium, Jaipur, coinciding with the 2019 IPL's playoffs. IPL Supernovas won their second title, by beating IPL Velocity in final by 4 wickets.

The season was viewed by 71 million unique viewers in India, and recorded 2.20 billion minutes in viewership in India.

Squads

Points table

 Advanced to final

Round-robin

Final

References

External links
 Series home at ESPN Cricinfo

Women's T20 Challenge
2018–19 Indian women's cricket
Women's Twenty20 cricket competitions